Workers' Democracy (Ergatiki Dimokratia) is a Trotskyist organisation in Cyprus. It is part of the International Socialist Tendency founded by the British Socialist Workers Party. 

International Socialist Tendency
Communist parties in Cyprus
Trotskyist organizations in Europe